A hell house is a haunted attraction typically run by American fundamentalist Christian churches.

Hell house may also refer to:

Hell House (novel), a 1971 horror novel by Richard Matheson
Hell House (film), a 2001 American documentary
Hell House LLC, a 2015 American found-footage horror film
 "Hell House" (Supernatural), a 2006 TV episode
 Hell House, a 2006 play by Alex Timbers
Hell House, a 2015 program broadcast by Investigation Discovery

See also
Hell's House, a 1932 film directed by Howard Higgin
The Legend of Hell House, a 1973 film adaptation of Matheson's novel